Edward Frederick Leveson-Gower DL, JP (3 May 1819 – 30 May 1907), styled The Honourable from birth, was a British barrister and Liberal politician. He was commonly known under his second forename and was sometimes nicknamed Freddy Leveson.

Early life
Leveson-Gower was the second surviving son of Granville Leveson-Gower, 1st Earl Granville and his wife Lady Harriet Elizabeth Cavendish, second daughter of Lady Georgiana Spencer and William Cavendish, 5th Duke of Devonshire. He spent his early childhood, first in his father's residence at Wherstead, and when his father had become ambassador in France in 1824, at the British embassy in Paris, where he was a playmate of Henri, comte de Chambord.

Aged eight, he was sent back to England on a school in Brighton, after which he entered Eton College. Leveson-Gower left the latter in 1835 and was privately educated for the next two years, until he went on Christ Church, Oxford in 1837. He graduated with a Bachelor of Arts in 1840 and a Master of Arts four years later.

Career
After his Grand Tour, he was then called to the bar by the Inner Temple in 1845, practising in the Oxford circuit.

Leveson-Gower entered the British House of Commons for Derby with the support of his uncle William Cavendish, 6th Duke of Devonshire in May 1847. However, the election was overturned on petition in July and Leveson-Gower did not stand in the by-election. From 1851, he worked as précis writer in the Foreign Office until the following year, when by the influence of his cousin George Sutherland-Leveson-Gower, 2nd Duke of Sutherland, he stood successfully as a Member of Parliament (MP) for Stoke-upon-Trent. In 1856, Leveson-Gower joined his brother Granville on a special mission to Russia. He lost his seat, however, in the general election of 1857.

Two years later, he was returned for Bodmin and represented the constituency until his retirement from politics in 1885. Leveson-Gower was a Justice of the Peace for Surrey and served as a Deputy Lieutenant for the county.

Personal life
Having travelled to India in 1850, Leveson-Gower, after his return, married Lady Margaret Compton, daughter of Spencer Compton, 2nd Marquess of Northampton, on 1 June 1851. She died only a few years later. Their only son:

 George Granville Leveson-Gower (1858–1951), who later in the Parliament of the United Kingdom for North West Staffordshire and also for Stoke-upon-Trent. He married the Hon. Adelaide Violet Cicely Monson, daughter of Debonnaire John Monson, 8th Baron Monson.

He died in 1907, aged 88, having been in his later life a friend of William Ewart Gladstone and his wife.

References

External links

1819 births
1907 deaths
Alumni of Christ Church, Oxford
Deputy Lieutenants of Surrey
Frederick Leveson-Gower (Bodmin)
Members of the Inner Temple
Members of the Parliament of the United Kingdom for Bodmin
Liberal Party (UK) MPs for English constituencies
UK MPs 1847–1852
UK MPs 1852–1857
UK MPs 1859–1865
UK MPs 1865–1868
UK MPs 1868–1874
UK MPs 1874–1880
UK MPs 1880–1885
Younger sons of earls
People educated at Eton College
English barristers